Brian Boland (26 July 1931 – 20 April 2012) was  a former Australian rules footballer who played for Richmond and Hawthorn in the Victorian Football League (VFL).

Notes

External links 
		

1931 births
2012 deaths
Australian rules footballers from Victoria (Australia)
Richmond Football Club players
Hawthorn Football Club players